Michaelbeuern Abbey is a Benedictine monastery in Dorfbeuern near Salzburg in Austria.

History
A monastic cell existed here as early as 736 or thereabouts, referred to in the Aachen Monastery Register("Klosterverzeichnis") in 817 as "Buria". After
the Hungarian wars, reconstruction began in 977 with an endowment from Emperor Otto II. More times of crisis came upon the abbey with the fire of 1346,
mismanagement of the prebendal income and the effects of the Reformation.

From the 17th century however Michaelbeuern began a long period of prosperity, which led to ambitious building works, for example the Baroque high altar of 1691 in the abbey church, by Meinrad Guggenbichler and Johann Michael Rottmayr. At this time more than twenty-five monks of Michaelbeuern gained their
doctorates at the Benedictine University of Salzburg. The community also took on many pastoral responsibilities in the surrounding parishes. During the National Socialist period the monks were expelled, but returned after World War II. The abbey church, re-romanised, was re-dedicated in 1950. 

From 1641 the abbey was a member of the Salzburg Congregation, which in 1930 was merged into the present Austrian Congregation of the Benedictine Confederation.

The abbey today
The abbey today is a thriving Benedictine community, well known as an educational and cultural centre. The abbey runs a school and owns different 	 business like a farm, a  district heating plant, a biogas plant  and a participation in a brewery (Augustiner Bräu Kloster Mülln). The present  abbot is Johannes Perkmann who was elected in 2006.

Church

External links
 Michaelbeuern Abbey website

Benedictine monasteries in Austria
Buildings and structures in Salzburg (state)
Museums in Salzburg (state)
Religious museums in Austria
Art museums and galleries in Austria